Justice Rutledge may refer to:

John Rutledge, associate justice and chief justice of the United States Supreme Court
Wiley Blount Rutledge, associate justice of the United States Supreme Court